Zhu Xiaolin (born 20 February 1984) is a female Chinese long-distance runner, who specialises in marathons. She has won the Xiamen International Marathon and was third at the 2010 Rotterdam Marathon. She represented China at the 2008 Beijing Olympics and was fourth in the women's marathon. Zhu has also competed at the World Championships in Athletics, where she finished in the top five in the marathon in both 2007 and 2009. Her personal best over the distance is 2 hours and 23:57 minutes.

In 2005, she was sixth at the Beijing Marathon and travelled to Nanjing to take part in the 10th Chinese National Games soon after. She finished as runner-up in the women's 5000 metres behind Xing Huina, making a 36-second improvement to her personal best to secure the silver medal. Early in the following year she competed at the 2006 Asian Indoor Athletics Championships and she managed a championship record of 9:25.60 to win the gold medal over 3000 metres.

She won at the Yangzhou Half Marathon in April 2007. Zhu finished fourth at the 2007 World Championships marathon. In the following year she achieved the same result, finishing fourth in the 2008 Olympics Marathon. In 2009 Zhu Xiaolin took part in the 2009 World Championships Marathon, resulting in a fifth place in 2:26:08 this time.

She entered the 2010 Stramilano Half Marathon and took second place behind Jane Kiptoo but set a personal best time of 1:10:07. She took part in the 2010 Rotterdam Marathon shortly afterwards and finished in third place in 2:29:42. She won the Amatrice-Configno road race in August, beating compatriot Jia Chaofeng.

Personal bests
1500 metres - 4:12.73 min (2005)
5000 metres - 15:22.35 min (2005)
10,000 metres - 31:53.96 min (2010)
Half marathon – 1:10:07 hrs (2010)
Marathon - 2:23:57 hrs (2002)

International competitions

Professional races

National competitions
Chinese Athletics Championships
5000 m: 4th (2002), 3rd (2006)
10,000 m: 8th (2002), 17th (2005), 4th (2009)
China City Games
10,000 m: 2nd (2003)
National Games of China
5000 m: 2nd (2005)
10,000 m: 6th (2009), 17th (2013)
Marathon team: 3rd (2013)
Chinese Cross Country Championships
Women's race: 6th (2006)

References

External links

 
 

1984 births
Living people
Chinese female long-distance runners
Chinese female marathon runners
Athletes (track and field) at the 2008 Summer Olympics
Athletes (track and field) at the 2012 Summer Olympics
Olympic athletes of China
Asian Games medalists in athletics (track and field)
Runners from Liaoning
Sportspeople from Anshan
Athletes (track and field) at the 2010 Asian Games
Asian Games silver medalists for China
Medalists at the 2010 Asian Games